A kickback is a form of negotiated bribery in which a commission is paid to the bribe-taker in exchange for services rendered. Generally speaking, the remuneration (money, goods, or services handed over) is negotiated ahead of time.  The kickback varies from other kinds of bribes in that there is implied collusion between agents of the two parties, rather than one party extorting the bribe from the other. The purpose of the kickback is usually to encourage the other party to cooperate in the scheme.

The term "kickback" comes from colloquial English language, and describes the way a recipient of illegal gain "kicks back" a portion of it to another person for that person's assistance in obtaining it.

Types and methods
The most common form of kickback involves a vendor submitting a fraudulent or inflated invoice (often for goods or services which were not needed, of inferior quality, or both), with an employee of the victim company assisting in securing payment. For their assistance in securing payment, the individual receives some sort of payment (cash, goods, services) or favor (the hiring of a relative, employment, etc.).

"Kickback brokers" are individuals who may not receive the kickback personally, but who help link the individual or company providing the goods or services with individuals capable of assisting with the illegal payments.  For helping to link the two colluding parties, either or both parties may make a payment to this "broker".

In government
Kickbacks are one of the most common forms of government corruption. In some cases, the kickback takes the form of a "cut of the action," and can be so well known as to be common knowledge—and even become part of a nation's culture.  For example, in Indonesia, President Suharto was publicly known as "Mr. Twenty-Five Percent" because he required that all major contracts throughout the nation provide him with 25 percent of the income before he would approve the contract. Also, in Pakistan, President Asif Ali Zardari was publicly known as "Mr. Ten Percent" for a similar reason; after coming into the government, he started taking 10% of all major contract investments before he would approve the contract. However, kickbacks differ from other forms of corruption, such as diversion of assets, as in embezzlement, because of the collusion between two parties.

Kickback schemes can be pervasive. For example, in the United States, companies providing medical services to Medicare patients were paying doctors to send patients to them, whether or not the patient needed the treatment, diagnosis, or test.  In 1987, the United States Congress passed the stringent Anti-Kickback Enforcement Act to prevent such schemes.

In Italy, the political scene was realigned dramatically by the Tangentopoli scandals in the 1990s, which uncovered widespread use of kickbacks in the national and local governments.

See also 

 Annates
 Anti-competitive practices
 Baksheesh
 Bid rigging
 Charbonneau Commission
 Conflict of interest
 Fraud
 Kickbacks
 Tangentopoli

References

Bibliography
Albrecht, W. Steve; Albrecht, Conan C.; Albrecht, Chad O.; and Zimbelman, Mark F. Fraud Examination. Mason, Ohio: Cengage Learning, 2012.
Buchbinder, Sharon B. and Shanks, Nancy H. Introduction to Health Care Management. Boston: Jones & Bartlett, 2007.
Campos, Jose Edgardo. The Many Faces of Corruption: Tracking Vulnerabilities at the Sector Level. Washington, D.C.: World Bank, 2007.
Kranacher, Mary-Jo; Riley, Richard; and Wells, Joseph T. Forensic Accounting and Fraud Examination. Hoboken, N.J.: Wiley, 2010.

Bribery
Contract law